Novoalexeyevsky is the name of several rural localities in Russia:
Novoalexeyevsky, Republic of Adygea, a khutor in Koshekhablsky District of Republic of Adygea
Novoalexeyevsky, Krasnodar Krai, a khutor in Seversky District of Krasnodar Krai
Novoalexeyevsky, Oryol Oblast, a village in Dmitrovsky District of Oryol Oblast